Mikołaj Hussowczyk. Other name spelling variants include Hussoviensis, Hussovianus, Ussovius, Hussowski, Gusowski); ( – ) was an early Renaissance poet and humanist of Poland and Grand Duchy of Lithuania, and cultural and social activist. His most notable work is a poem Carmen de statura...bisontis (Song about...the bison).

Biography
Little is known of his life, except during the 1520s. His place of birth is alternatively stated as Husów/Hussowo near Łańcut or in an unspecified Belarusian village with similar-sounding name
 (there are many Belarusian toponyms of the Usava, Husau, Usa kind. Some folkloristic features in the works of Husowski may point to regions in the vicinity of Hrodna).

He was probably a student of Kraków Academy since 1504. Before 1515 he became cleric of Diocese of Przemyśl and public notary of the Holy See. Hussowczyk served the Grand Treasurer of the Crown Andrzej Kościelecki and prepared his last will when he was one death bed in Pszczyna in 1515.

Next Hussowczyk became a courtier of Grand Chancellor of Lithuania Mikołaj Radzwiłł. At his request Hussowczyk prepared the last will of Radzwiłł's cousin Zofia Sudymuntówna in 1518. In 1521 he travelled to Rome with a stuffed European bison, which was supposed to be a gift from Mikołaj Radzwiłł to Pope Leon X. In Rome, Hussowczyk met Erazm Ciołek, the Bishop of Płock. At this occasion Hussowczyk prepared Carmen de statura...bisontis. Sadly both gifts turned out to be redundant, because pope died in December 1521, before giving the audience.

Ciołek died in 1522 and Radzwiłł's a year before, so Hussowczyk deprived of a patron settled down in Kraków, where he probably had his ordination.

Hussowczyk was active in both the Crown and Lithuania, along with his uncertain birthplace, modern Polish, Lithuanian and Belarusian researchers tend to ascribe works of Hussowczyk to their respective cultural heritages.

Works
Per the scope of his literary works, Hussowczyk is considered to be the founder of the Belarusian Renaissance literary tradition, and author of the oldest examples of Polish-Latin poetry of the early Renaissance. Hussowczyk wrote in publicistical, epic, heroic, lyrical, historical and satirical genres.

His Latin poem Carmen de statura, feritate ac venatione bisontis ("A Song about the Appearance, Savagery and Hunting of the Bison", Kraków 1523) is considered to be the first large scale fictional work about Medieval Lithuania (or Belarus), describing the bison's life and habits, Lithuania's landscape and the relationship of its inhabitants with the environment. Written in Latin for Pope Leo X, an avid hunter, the poem stems from Hussowczyk's experience in hunting and observing bison, and contains no literary comparisons with ancient legendary creatures. Due to the deaths of both the Pope and Hussowczyk's patron, bishop Ciołek, the poem was eventually presented to Polish Queen Bona in Kraków. According to Polish researcher Edmund Kotarski, Hussowczyk belonged to the circle of Polish-Latin poets of the early Renaissance.

His best known works are:
 Carmen de statura feritate ac venatione bisontis (English: The Song about Bison, Its Stature, Ferocity and Hunt), written in Classical Latin, 1522.
 Nova et miranda victoria de Turcis mense Iulio (New and famous victory over Turks in month of July), written in one day, under the impression from the victory of the Polish Great Hetman of the Crown Mikołaj Firlej over Turks by Trembowla on July 2, 1524.
 De vita et gestis Divi Hyacinthi (Life and feats of St. Hyacynth), about Polish Saint Hyacinth (1525).

See also
Renaissance in Poland

Notes

References

Further reading
Jerzy Ochmański Narodowość Mikołaja Hussowskiego w świetle jego autografu w: Słowiańszczyzna i dzieje powszechne Warszawa 1985 s. 317
J. Pelczar, Mikołaj Hussowski, jego życie i dzieła. Ustęp z dziejów humanizmu w Polsce, Kraków 1900,
J. Krókowski, Mikołaja Hussowskiego Carmen de bisonte, Wrocław 1959,
C. Backvis, Mikołaj z Hussowa, w: Tegoż, Szkice o kulturze staropolskiej, Warsawa 1975.
J. Ziomek, Renesans, Warszawa 1998.
Entry in Polski Słownik Biograficzny
 F. Booth, Song of the Bison: Text and Translation of Nicolaus Hussovianus's "Carmen de statura, feritate, ac venatione bisontis" (English and Latin Edition) Leeds: Arc Humanities Press; (December 31, 2019).

External links

Biography and text of "Carmen de bisontis", translation into Polish by Jan Kasprowicz
A poem on bison, translation into English by Michał J. Mikoś
 Dariusz Rott, Mikołaj Hussowski
Text of "Carmen de bisontis" in Lithuanian
Text of "Carmen de bisontis" in Belarusian
"Hunting the Lithuanina Bison" Amphora 6.1, by Frederick J. Booth

1480s births
1530s deaths
16th-century Latin-language writers
Polish male writers
Polish Roman Catholics
Polish Roman Catholic priests
New Latin-language poets
Belarusian writers
Belarusian Roman Catholic priests